West Sharyland is a census-designated place (CDP) in Hidalgo County, Texas. The population was 2,309 at the 2010 United States Census. It is part of the McAllen–Edinburg–Mission Metropolitan Statistical Area.

Geography
Sharyland is located at  (26.276838, -98.338393).

Demographics
As of the census of 2000, there were 2,947 people, 676 households, and 648 families residing in the CDP. The population density was 1,275.5 people per square mile (492.6/km2). There were 743 housing units at an average density of 321.6/sq mi (124.2/km2). The racial makeup of the CDP was 85.34% White, 0.03% African American, 0.07% Native American, 0.24% Pacific Islander, 13.98% from other races, and 0.34% from two or more races. Hispanic or Latino of any race were 98.10% of the population.

There were 676 households, out of which 69.1% had children under the age of 18 living with them, 78.3% were married couples living together, 14.5% had a female householder with no husband present, and 4.1% were non-families. 3.7% of all households were made up of individuals, and 1.9% had someone living alone who was 65 years of age or older. The average household size was 4.36 and the average family size was 4.44.

In the CDP, the population was spread out, with 42.3% under the age of 18, 12.5% from 18 to 24, 28.9% from 25 to 44, 12.3% from 45 to 64, and 3.9% who were 65 years of age or older. The median age was 22 years. For every 100 females, there were 93.9 males. For every 100 females age 18 and over, there were 89.6 males.

The median income for a household in the CDP was $24,602, and the median income for a family was $24,393. Males had a median income of $17,283 versus $15,125 for females. The per capita income for the CDP was $8,383. About 31.5% of families and 30.9% of the population were below the poverty line, including 36.0% of those under age 18 and 32.9% of those age 65 or over.

Development 
The areas growth is largely a result of the economic changes spawned by the North American Free Trade Agreement (NAFTA) ).The region is also becoming popular as a bedroom community for white collar workers and professionals working in McAllen and Mission. A 1998 Census Bureau study found that McAllen-Mission is the third fastest growing metropolitan area in the United States.

Education 
Portions of the West Sharyland census-designated place are served by two school districts: Mission Consolidated Independent School District and La Joya Independent School District.

Sections of the Mission CISD portion are served by Cantu, Cavazos, and Waitz elementary schools in Alton. All Mission CISD residents are zoned to Alton Memorial Junior High School in Alton and Mission High School in Mission.

Zoned LJISD schools are Kika de la Garza Elementary School, Memorial Middle School, and Palmview High School.

Notable people
John H. Shary Founder of Sharyland and the Rio Grande Valley citrus industry. His daughter, Marialice, married Texas Governor Allan Shivers.

 John J. Conway  Purchased the land that would become Sharyland from the Catholic Church before selling much of it to John Shary. Conway played an instrumental role in developing an irrigation system for local farms, and founded the city of Mission Texas; much of unincorporated Sharyland actually lies within Mission's city limits.

Lloyd Bentsen Born in Sharyland and graduated from Sharyland High School. Bentsen was a four-term Senator, vice-presidential candidate, and from 1993 to 1994 served as Bill Clinton's Treasury Secretary.

William Jennings Bryan Retired to Sharyland after his third unsuccessful run for the presidency in 1908. Bryan and his wife remained in Sharyland until 1913 when President Woodrow Wilson made him Secretary of State. After leaving the cabinet in 1915, Bryan sold the "Bryan House" in Sharyland and moved to Florida. Bryan achieved his greatest fame shortly before his death when he squared off against Clarence Darrow in the famous "Scopes Trial", which tested whether evolution could be taught in the classroom.

Jorge Cantú Major League Baseball player for the Texas Rangers who was born in McAllen, Texas and graduated from Sharyland High School.

See also 
 Sharyland High School

References

External links
 Photographs of Sharyland Excursions from the University of Texas-Pan American hosted by the Portal to Texas History

Census-designated places in Hidalgo County, Texas
Census-designated places in Texas